[[File:Ekaterina Vilkova and Igor Voynarovsky.jpg|thumb|right|250px|Shooting a scene for the 2008 Russian film Stilyagi]]

Stilyagi ("stylish, style hunters") were members of a youth counterculture from the late 1940s until the early 1960s in the Soviet Union.  A stilyaga was primarily distinguished by snappy clothing—preferably foreign-label, acquired from fartsovshchiks (those who engage in fartsovka) —that contrasted with the communist realities of the time, and a fascination with zagranitsa, modern Western music and fashions corresponding to those of the Beat Generation. English writings on Soviet culture variously translated the derogatory term as "dandies", "fashionistas", "beatniks", "hipsters", or "zoot suiters".

Today, the stilyagi phenomenon is regarded as one of the Russian historical social trends which further developed during the late Soviet era (notably the Stagnation Period) and allowed "informal" views on life, such as hippies, punks and rappers.

Characteristics
Their apolitical views, neutral or negative attitudes toward Soviet morality, and their open admiration of modern, especially American, lifestyles were key characteristics that slowly developed during the 1950s.

At the dawn of the phenomenon, the stilyagi look was rather a caricature, inspired by movies from abroad of recent years. It resembled the zoot suit but combined different bright colors. By the late fifties, the look had evolved into something more elegant and stylish. Typical stilyagi wear included narrow pants, long jackets, narrow ties, bright-colored shirts, and thick soled shoes.

Usually stilyagi enjoyed popular American music of the 1940s, especially swing and boogie-woogie, especially the music of Glenn Miller, Benny Goodman and the soundtrack from the film Sun Valley Serenade. The "serenade" instantly became a cult among stilyagi, and one of its songs, the famous "Chattanooga Choo Choo", served as their unofficial anthem. Stilyagi developed their own styles of dance originating from boogie-woogie and later also adopted rock-n-roll.

History and legacy

The first stilyagi were from the generation of young adults in their early twenties who had lived through the hard times of economic crisis and World War II, leaving them perturbed about the future of their lives. Many of the young men returning from the army were heavily influenced by the contact with the foreign countries and modern trends at the time. As a result, many of them wore clothes based on images from abroad (early 1940s romance films, daily newspapers and photographs) and young women later adopted styles from modern female stereotypes too.

The main cause of this phenomenon was the struggle between capitalism and communism-led societies. The enforced uniformity of the Soviet thought and the heavy weight of its dictatorship were the only politically correct form of view, lifestyle and self-expression permitted during Stalinism. Therefore, the stilyagi sought to follow the modern ideology and morality in order to avoid Soviet pressure and its influence on society.

The stilyagi were largely repressed until Stalin's death in 1953, which let the style grow into a counterculture. By 1955, the stilyagi had acquired both respect and contempt from many layers of society (especially the then emerging Soviet upper-middle class, known as "intelligentsia") and were frowned upon in political instances, but had grown too many in number to be repressed. Thus, instead of trying to get rid of them, the media and politics, including journalism, eagerly mocked their style by portraying them as ridiculous as opposed to "normal" parts of Soviet society.

In the mid-1950s, many people were arrested for making musical recordings on "bones" (developed X-ray films). Those found guilty of manufacturing and distributing such recordings received from three to five years of imprisonment in labour camps for what the government considered to be profiteering.

In the late 1950s, the catchphrase "Today he dances jazz, but tomorrow [he] will sell [his] homeland" (Сегодня он танцует джаз, а завтра Родину продаст), became the stilyagi's signature and the key idea underlying their social protest. Stilyagi were recognized as an official musical, artistic and pop culture movement that later took on further modern influences, notably rockabilly, rock-n-roll and pop rock musical genres.

Following the international festival of 1957, however, the USSR became more open to modern culture. The official ban on jazz music was removed, and many records became available in stores from the 1960s. Admiration of modern music, especially the rock-n-roll wave of the sixties, met more tolerance from official ideology and little active resistance. All this contributed to the decline of the movement in the early sixties, as former stilyagi abandoned the lifestyles of their youth, while the next generation felt no need to follow such a lifestyle in order to enjoy modern culture or a nonpolitical way of life.

The influence of the stilyagi movement on Soviet-Russian culture is tremendous. Many of today's most respected Russian musicians, writers, film editors and other cultural personalities belonged to the movement, or shared its free, bohemian lifestyle. There is a 2008 Russian comedy musical film, Stilyagi, about this subculture.

See also

 1950s youth fashion 
 Hep cat, another Western counterpart to the Stilyagi
La Sape, a similar movement that originated in the Democratic Republic of Congo during the 1980s
 1980s in African fashion 
 Swenka, a South African variant in the 2010s
 2010s in African fashion
 The Moon is a Harsh Mistress, a 1966 novel by Robert A. Heinlein describing a similar fictional subculture on the Moon

Notes

References
Alan M. Ball (2003). Imagining America: Influence and Images in Twentieth-Century Russia. Lanham, Md.: Rowman & Littlefield. pp. 309. 

Further reading
Georgy Litvinov, Стиляги, как это было. Документальный роман, a documentary book about the subculture based on recollection of famous stilyagas, such as jazzman Aleksei Kozlov (:ru:Козлов, Алексей Семёнович).
Чуваки на хатах, Rodina Magazine,'' no. 7, 2005 

Russian youth culture
Musical subcultures
1940s fashion
Soviet culture
Fashion aesthetics
Counterculture

cs:Potápka (osoba)